The Bombardier–Alstom HHP-8 (High Horse Power 8000) is a type of twin-cab electric locomotive manufactured by a consortium of Bombardier Transportation and Alstom for Amtrak and MARC. The locomotive's electrical drive technology is directly derived from the SNCF BB 36000 manufactured by Alstom.

A small class size and reliability problems with correspondingly high per capita maintenance and replacement costs led Amtrak to retire all of its HHP-8s after only a decade in service. MARC initially made the decision to retire their HHP-8s, but later opted to refurbish their fleet from 2017 to 2018.

Background 
Amtrak assumed control of almost all private sector intercity passenger rail service in the United States on May 1, 1971. The centerpiece of Amtrak's system was the Northeast Corridor, a  line between Washington, D.C. and Boston, Massachusetts, via New York City. The line was electrified from Washington through New York to New Haven, Connecticut; diesel locomotives handled trains over the remaining  between New Haven and Boston. In the 1990s Amtrak rebuilt and electrified the route as part of the project which established high-speed Acela Express service between Washington and Boston. The elimination of diesel service between New Haven and Boston meant that Amtrak would need additional electric locomotives to pull conventional trains east of New Haven. Neither of Amtrak's existing designs, the EMD AEM-7 and GE E60, were still in production, and the latter was slated for retirement. Amtrak chose to have Bombardier and Alstom, makers of the Acela Express, produce a visually-similar derivative for conventional service.

Design 
This was  longer than the AEM-7, though still shorter than the E60. The locomotive weighs . The carbody is stainless steel; the locomotive has a 6 MJ crash energy absorbance structure.

Reflecting the varied electrification schemes on the Northeast Corridor the locomotives were designed to operate at three different voltages: 12 kV 25 Hz AC, 12.5 kV 60 Hz AC, and 25 kV 60 Hz AC. The electrical traction system is directly derived from the system used on Alstom's BB 36000 Astride locomotives; this includes four  three phase asynchronous traction motors powered by GTO based inverters, with one inverter per motor; the electric system also allows regenerative and rheostatic braking.

History 

Amtrak ordered 15 HHP-8s in 1996 at the same time as its Acela Express trainsets. The HHP-8s have external styling that is similar to the Acela power cars, but are designed to operate as independent locomotives, hauling conventional passenger rolling stock. The units supplemented the EMD AEM-7s and allowed Amtrak to commence retirement of the GE E60. Amtrak did not purchase the locomotives outright but leased them from Philip Morris Capital.

The locomotive's original type designation was HHL-8, for "High Horsepower Locomotive, 8,000 (nominal) horsepower". This was subsequently changed to HHP-8.

In conjunction with the Amtrak order, MARC also acquired six HHP-8s, which MARC uses on their Penn Line service along the Northeast Corridor between Perryville and Washington, DC.

Amtrak operated its HHP-8s on the Northeast Corridor between Boston and Washington, DC; racking up approximately 1,000,000 miles each in service (based on 2009 figure).

In 2002, Amtrak's fleet of 15 units was temporarily withdrawn along with the Acela Express trains due to cracks in components of the trucks.

Amtrak retirement
Amtrak's HHP-8s suffered from low reliability. As a result, after only one decade in service, their replacement was considered, concurrent with the replacement of the older AEM-7 locomotive fleet, since a large order for a standardized fleet would have price economies, and the resultant fleet would have lower overall maintenance costs. A replacement fleet of 70 locomotives starting delivery in 2012 was planned, with HHP-8s kept as a reserve in the short term.

In October 2010, Amtrak ordered 70 Siemens ACS-64 locomotives to replace both the HHP-8 and the older AEM-7 locomotives, with deliveries beginning in early 2013. Amtrak retired its last HHP-8 on November 7, 2014. All units are now stored; to avoid duplicate numbering with ACS-64 units 650–664, Amtrak renumbered its retired HHP-8s to 680–694. Philip Morris sued Amtrak in 2019, alleging that Amtrak had cannibalized eight of the fifteen locomotives for parts, in violation of the terms of the lease. The two parties settled the lawsuit in 2021; the terms were not disclosed.

MARC refurbishment 

While reports in 2016 indicated that MARC planned to retire their HHP-8 locomotives and replace them with Siemens SC-44 Charger locomotives, MARC instead started a refurbishment program for its HHP-8s in 2017.  Issues with equipment cooling that kept the HHP-8 locomotives from properly working were addressed.

, the first HHP-8 reconditioned under this program had been delivered and was undergoing successful testing.

, the first HHP-8 reconditioned was running for three weeks without major issue (a software issue was corrected in this time).  A second HHP-8 was being reconditioned.

, The second HHP-8 had the most unreliable power control components replaced and was back in service. The remainder of the upgrade on this locomotive was to be done by the end of 2018. MARC planned to upgrade the remaining HHP-8 locomotives in their fleet.

Named units 
There is only one HHP-8 that is named. MARC unit #4913 is named "Kathryn D. Waters" after a former administrator of the Maryland Transit Administration.

References

External links 

 

Amtrak locomotives
B-B locomotives
Alstom locomotives
Bombardier Transportation locomotives
11 kV AC locomotives
25 kV AC locomotives
Electric locomotives of the United States
Multi-system locomotives
Passenger trains running at least at 200 km/h in commercial operations
Standard gauge locomotives of the United States
Passenger locomotives